Cape Town railway station is the main railway station of the city of Cape Town, South Africa. It is located along Adderley and Strand Streets in the city's central business district.

Lines

Metrorail lines
Cape Town station is the hub of the Metrorail Western Cape commuter rail network, which is operated by the Metrorail division of the Passenger Rail Agency of South Africa (PRASA). The network consists of four lines, all of which originate from Cape Town: the Southern Line via the Southern Suburbs to Simon's Town; the Cape Flats Line via Athlone to Retreat; the Central Line via Langa to Mitchell's Plain, Khayelitsha and Bellville; and the Northern Line via Bellville to Paarl, Stellenbosch and Somerset West.

Shosholoza Meyl
Shosholoza Meyl, the inter-city rail division of PRASA, operates several long-distance passenger rail services from Cape Town: a daily service to and from Johannesburg via Kimberley; a weekly service to and from Durban via Kimberley, Bloemfontein and Pietermaritzburg; and a weekly service to and from East London. These trains terminate at Cape Town station, as well as making a brief stop at Bellville.

Shosholoza Meyl also operates a semi-luxury Premier Classe service from Cape Town: weekly trains to and from Johannesburg via Kimberley.

Other
Cape Town Railway Station is also used by the luxury tourist-oriented Blue Train and the private train holiday company Rovos Rail.

Services

History and alterations

The first structure

The first railway station in Cape Town was a rudimentary wooden structure built in 1861, and was located near the current Golden Acre shopping centre. Cape Town's railways were in their infancy and the early station was small and simple.

The Victorian building

In 1875 Cape Prime Minister John Molteno began construction of a massive stone complex to serve as the central station to the rapidly-expanding railway network being built. The site chosen was near the bottom of Adderley Street (where its successor still stands).

It was large enough to contain the increasing number of train platforms and  the headquarters of the recently formed Cape Government Railways, but additional enlargements were nonetheless added over the coming years.

The current station
Nearly a hundred years later in the 1960s, the historic stone Victorian building was demolished by the [government] to make way for a modern building that would allow for the racial segregation of all commuters.

The current station complex is the result of alterations due to the preparations for the 2010 Soccer World Cup. Like its predecessor it covers between 25 and 35 city blocks. The renovations are a joint initiative between PRASA-Metrorail and Intersite, the property management company..
The immediate emphasis was on improving the look and feel as well as commuter comfort, with better access, information, safety and security ahead of the 2010 soccer World Cup.

Notable places nearby
Cape Town railway station is the only one in the City Bowl, so it is the nearest station to all the places of interest in central Cape Town. In the immediate vicinity of the station can be found:
 Cape Town City Hall
 Cape Town Civic Centre
 Artscape Theatre Centre
 The Grand Parade
 Castle of Good Hope

See also

 Cape Government Railways
 Passenger Rail Agency of South Africa

References

External links

Railway stations in Cape Town
Railway stations opened in 1863
Shosholoza Meyl stations
Metrorail Western Cape stations